Fugitive Kind is a 1937 play written by Tennessee Williams. The play is evocative of a Clifford Odets Depression era play. The action takes place in a flophouse in Two Rivers, Mississippi during the waning days of 1936, as the New Year 1937 is imminent. The play features a lonesome clerk, who oversees a hotel that houses a collection of alcoholic losers and a rebellious college student. The owner of the hotel is an obsessive Jew. The clerk is befriended by an on-the-run gangster, Terry Meighan, who claims to be a victim of the corrupt social system. He represents hope to the hotel clerk.

Reviews
 

Plays by Tennessee Williams
Plays set in Mississippi
1937 plays